Ololygon ariadne is a species of frog in the family Hylidae.
It is endemic to Brazilch.
Its natural habitats are subtropical or tropical moist lowland forests, subtropical or tropical moist montane forests, and rivers.

References

ariadne
Endemic fauna of Brazil
Amphibians described in 1967
Taxonomy articles created by Polbot